Darrell Preston Jackson is a former professional baseball pitcher. He pitched all or parts of five seasons in the majors, from  until , all with the Minnesota Twins.

Career
Jackson was drafted by the Twins out of high school in 1973, but he did not sign with them. Instead, he played college baseball at Arizona State University, where he played in the College World Series in each of his last three seasons there.

In , he was drafted by the Twins in the 9th round of the amateur draft. He made his professional debut in 1978 for the Orlando Twins of the Southern League, and in his very first start he threw nine innings of no-hit ball against the Jacksonville Suns. Unfortunately, the game was tied after nine innings, and Jackson was relieved by fellow future Twin Jeff Holly. Orlando won the game, 1–0, in 12 innings.

After just 10 starts in the minors, Jackson was called up to the Twins in June. In 19 games, Jackson went 4–6 with a 4.48 ERA. He did record one shutout in 1978, on July 7 against the Oakland Athletics.

Jackson split  between the Twins and their Triple-A farm club, the Toledo Mud Hens. In the majors, he pitched in 24 games (including 8 starts), going 4–4 with a 4.28 ERA.  was Jackson's first (and, as it turned out, only) full season in the majors. He set career bests in wins (9), ERA (3.87), and strikeouts (90). On June 21, 1980, Jackson recorded his one and only save at the MLB level. He retired the last batter of the game to preserve a 3-2 victory over the Twins.

Things were no better in the minors, as he went 1–3 with an even worse ERA of 7.00 in 4 starts. On July 26, the Twins released Jackson, and he never again pitched in organized baseball.

Jackson currently runs the 1020 Club, Inc. A nonprofit organization that helps at-risk youth.

References
http://1020clubinc.org

External links

Baseball Gauge
Retrosheet
Venezuelan Professional Baseball League

1956 births
Living people
African-American baseball players
American expatriate baseball players in Mexico
Arizona State Sun Devils baseball players
Baseball players from California
Leones del Caracas players
American expatriate baseball players in Venezuela
Major League Baseball pitchers
Mexican League baseball pitchers
Minnesota Twins players
Orlando Twins players
Rieleros de Aguascalientes players
Toledo Mud Hens players
21st-century African-American people
20th-century African-American sportspeople